Bhuj is a Municipality and District Headquarters of Kutch District in the state of Gujarat, India.

Etymology
According to legend, Kutch was ruled by the Nāga chieftains in the past. Sagai, a queen of Sheshapattana, who was married to King Bheria Kumar, rose up against Bhujanga, the last chieftain of Naga. After the battle, Bheria was defeated and Queen Sagai committed sati. The hill where they lived later came to be known as Bhujia Hill and the town at the foothill as Bhuj. Bhujang was later worshiped by the people as snake god, Bhujanga, and a temple was constructed to revere him.

History

Bhuj was founded by Rao Hamir in 1510 and was made the capital of Kutch by Rao Khengarji I in 1549. Its foundation stone as state capital was formally laid on Vikram Samvat 1604 Maagha 5th (approx. 25 January 1548). From 1590 onwards, when Rao was forced to acknowledge the Mughal supremacy, Bhuj came to be known as Suleiman Nagar amongst Muslims. The city's walls were built by Rao Godji I in 1723, and the Bhujia Fort by Devkaran Seth in Rao Deshalji I's time (1718 - 1741).

Bhuj has been attacked six times. In two instances, the defense was successful and in four other instances, the defense failed. In 1728, an attack by Sarbuland Khan, Mughal Viceroy of Gujarat, was repulsed by Rao Deshalji I, and, in 1765 Mian Ghulam Shah Kalhoro was, by a timely display of the strength of the fortifications, induced to withdraw. During the civil troubles of the reign of the Rao Rayadhan III, Bhuj was thrice taken, by Meghji Seth in 1786, by Hansraj in 1801, and by Fateh Muhammad in 1808. On 26 March 1819, the hill fort of Bhujia was captured by a British detachment under Sir William Keir.

In 1818, Bhuj had a population of 20,000 people. The earthquake on 16 June 1819 destroyed nearly 7000 houses with a loss of an estimated 1140 human lives. About one-third of the buildings that escaped ruin were heavily damaged, and the north face of the town wall was leveled with the ground.

The British garrison at Bhuj peaked in 1826 with nearly 1400 British troops (685 infantry, 543 dragoons, 90 foot artillery and 74 horse artillery) supported by over 5000 Indian soldiers. Amongst the highest profile British figures during this time was Alexander Burnes who was based here between 1826 and 1829.

In 1837, Bhuj is said to have had a population of 30,000, including 6,000 Muslims.

After independence of India in 1947, Kutch State acceded unto the dominion of India and was constituted an independent commissionaire, Kutch State. In 1956, Kutch State was merged with Bombay state, which in 1960 was divided into the new linguistic states of Gujarat and Maharashtra, with Kutch becoming part of Gujarat state as Kutch district. Bhuj is the district headquarters of Kutch District, the largest district in India.

On 21 July 1956 as well as on 26 January 2001, the city suffered great losses of life and property due to earthquakes. Many parts of Bhuj were demolished due to the extensive damage, whilst others were repaired. There has been great progress in rebuilding the City since the 2001 earthquake, with considerable improvements to roads, transportation, and infrastructure.

Bhuj is home to one of the first Swaminarayan Sampraday temples, built in 1822. Bhuj temple is one of the six original temples built during the earthly presence of the Lord Swaminarayan. The devotees living in Bhuj including Gangaram Mull, Sundarji Suthar and Hirji Suthar requested Lord to construct a temple at Bhuj. Lord instructed Vaishnavanand Swami to construct the temple, and Lord himself installed the murti of Lord NarNarayan Dev in Bhuj on VS 1879 on the 5th day of the bright half of the month of Vaishakh (Friday 15 May 1823 AD).

Geography
Bhuj has an average elevation of 110 metres (360 feet). On the eastern side of the city is a hill known as Bhujia Hill, on which there is a Bhujia Fort, that separates Bhuj city and Madhapar town ( considered one of the richest villages in Asia ). It has two lakes namely Hamirsar and Deshadsar (દેેેશળસર).

Climate
Bhuj has a borderline hot desert climate (Köppen BWh) just short of a hot semi-desert climate (BSh). Although annual rainfall "averages" around  the variability is among the highest in the world with coefficient of variation of around sixty per cent – among the few comparably variable climates in the world being the Line Islands of Kiribati, the Pilbara coast of Western Australia, the sertão of Northeastern Brazil, and the Cape Verde islands.

Apart from the cool mornings of the "winter" season from December to February, temperatures are very warm to sweltering throughout the year, which further reduces the effectiveness of the erratic monsoonal rainfall.

Places of interest

The Fort: The old city was surrounded by a fort wall with five major gates (Mahadev, Patvadi, Sarpat, Bhid and Vaniyavad) and one small gate known as Chhathi Bari (sixth window). The fort wall is 35 feet high and four feet thick, and during its use was armed with fifty-one guns. Much of the fort wall has either fallen down or been demolished, due to the damage sustained in the 2001 earthquake and the city's redevelopment.
 Hamirsar Lake
 Kutch Museum
 Prag Mahal
 Aina Mahal
 Sharadbaug Palace
 Chhatardi
 Ramkund
 Mohammad Pannah Masjid
 Bharatiya Sanskriti Darshan Museum
 Swaminarayan temple
 Bhujia Fort and Smritivan on Bhujia Hill
 Regional Science Centre
 Hill Garden
 Trimandir 
 Tapkeshwari Temple
 Vande Mataram Memorial at village Bhujodi near Bhuj
 Living and Learning Design Centre at Bhuj - Bhachau Hwy Opp. Anchor Company, Ajarakhpur, Bhuj

Demographics

In 2011 the population of Bhuj was 213,514, which consisted of 111,146 males and 102,368 females. A 2003 source reported that 24% of Bhuj's population was Muslim.

The slums of Bhuj are inhabited primarily by Muslims, Dalits and other minorities. For example, in the slums of Western Bhuj, an estimated 80% of the population is Muslim.

Culture

Bhuj is a famous destination within India for observing the historic craftsmanship of the Kutch region, including the textile crafts of bandhni (tie-dye), embroidery, and leatherwork. Artists of nearby villages bring their artwork for sale in 'Bhuj Haat', which is situated near Jubilee Ground. Locals often visit Hamirsar Lake for relaxation in natural surroundings.

Bhuj is also famous for its regional cuisine, especially Pakvans, chikki, Kutchhi Dabeli, (a vegetarian burger made with mashed potato, cooked with masala curry and chutneys), and regional Gujarati sweets.

Media and communications
State-owned All India Radio has a local station in Bhuj which transmits various programmes. Local TV channels and newspapers are the most popular media.

Education

Alfred High School, the first high school of Kutch, established in 1870, is also an architectural heritage of the town.

Krantiguru Shyamji Krishna Verma Kachchh University is located in Bhuj. The university has 41 colleges affiliated, nineteen of which are in Bhuj. The university grants degrees in arts, science, commerce, law education, management, pharmacy, social welfare, medicine and engineering.

Little Steps Montessori School is the first Montessori School in Kutch established in the year 2000 by the royal family of Tera-Kutch.

Primary and secondary
Matruchhaya Kanya Vidyalay Little Steps Montessori School Bhuj 
St. Xavier's High School, Bhuj
Alfred High School
Army Public School
Sheth V.D. High School 
Indira Bai Girls High School
Hope Foundation School near Ashapura Nagar
Shree Swaminarayan Vidhyalaya
Shishukunj International School
White House Public School
Matrushree R.D. Varsani high school
Kendriya Vidyalaya No.1, Airforce Station Bhuj
Kendriya Vidyalaya No.2, Army Cantt. Bhuj
Bhuj English School
Kiddy's Campus Nursery and Playhouse.
Shree Kutchi Leva Patel Kanya Vidhyamandir.

Higher education
Gujarat Adani Institute of Medical Science

Government Engineering College, Bhuj 

Government Polytechnic
Shri R. R. Lalan College
Sheth D. L. Law College
Industrial Training Institute
J B Thacker Commerce College
MEWS College of Management & IT
Sanskar Institute of Management & IT

Radio Station & Television
Bhuj has its own Radio Station with Studio. Prasar Bharati under Information and Broadcasting Ministry is operating Radio Studio. MW is available on 1314 kHz and FM is available on 103.7 MHz. There is also terrestrial DD channel available. DD National and DD Girnar available.

Transportation

Bhuj is connected to Ahmedabad, Vadodara, Surat Mumbai, Delhi, Kolkata, Pune, Gaziabad, Jaipur, Ajmer, Hapur, Moradabad, Bareilly, Kharagpur, Ujjain and other cities within India by railway.  The city has a domestic airport, from which daily flights connect to Mumbai with flights operated by Air India. State Transport buses are available from the ST stand in the middle of the town to various places in Gujarat. Additionally, many private tour operators also run frequent buses to major cities within and outside of the state of Gujarat. Kandla Airport is 53 km from Bhuj. The city may be navigated by the city bus and auto rickshaw.

Trains

References

 This article incorporates Public Domain text from

External links
 Kachchh University
 Bhuj Bole Chhe - Website maintained by the citizens of Bhuj about their city 
 Official Facebook page for Bhuj
 Facebook page of Bhuj Bole Chhe - Voice of Bhuj Citizens
 Anando restaurant - Bhuj

 
Former capital cities in India
1510 establishments in India
Populated places established in 1510